Philadelphus pubescens is a species of flowering plant in the hydrangea family known by the common name hoary mock orange. It is native to the eastern United States.  It is a perennial shrub. The flowers are white.

References

External links
 

Flora of the Southeastern United States
pubescens
Flora without expected TNC conservation status